Postal codes in the Netherlands, known as postcodes, are alphanumeric, consisting of four digits followed by two uppercase letters. The letters 'F', 'I', 'O', 'Q', 'U' and 'Y' were originally not used for technical reasons, but almost all existing combinations are now used as these letters were allowed for new locations starting 2005. The letter combinations 'SS', 'SD' and 'SA' are not used because of their associations with the Nazi occupation of the Netherlands.

The first two digits indicate a city and a region, the second two digits and the two letters indicate a range of house numbers, usually on the same street. Consequently, a postal address is uniquely defined by the postal code and the house number. On average, a Dutch postal code comprises eight single addresses. There are over 575,000 postal codes in the Netherlands .

 Stadsregio Amsterdam
 Postbus 626
 1000 AP  Amsterdam

Caribbean Netherlands
The three BES-islands, which became part of the country in 2010, do not as yet have postal codes. The address, the town and the island are sufficient for sending post to either island (with "Caribbean Netherlands" as country when sent from abroad). The Dutch government has plans for introducing postal codes on the islands that would be similar to the postal codes used in the European Netherlands.

References

External links
Postal code search engine

Netherlands
Postal system of the Netherlands